Lophophorine is a bio-active alkaloid made by various cacti in the Lophophora family.

References

Lophophora
Heterocyclic compounds with 3 rings
Methoxy compounds
Oxygen heterocycles
Nitrogen heterocycles
Isoquinoline alkaloids